Orectoloboides is an extinct genus of wobbegong sharks (family Orectolobidae). It was described by Cappetta in 1977. A new species, O. angulatus, was described from the Cenomanian age of Canada by Charlie J. Underwood and Stephen L. Cumbaa in 2010.

Species
 Orectoloboides parvulus (Dalinkevicius, 1935)
 Orectoloboides multistriatus Werner, 1989
 Orectoloboides reyndersi Adnet, 2006
 Orectoloboides angulatus Underwood & Cumbaa, 2010
 Orectoloboides gijseni Herman & Van Den Eeckhaut, 2010

Two species formerly assigned to this genus, O. glashoffi Thies, 1981 and O. pattersoni Thies, 1983, were transferred to the separate genus Ornatoscyllium by Underwood & Ward (2004).

References

External links
 Orectoloboides at the Paleobiology Database

Prehistoric cartilaginous fish genera
Fossils of Canada
Paleontology in Saskatchewan